Noble College in Machilipatnam was founded by late Robert Turlington Noble, an English missionary, in 1843. Rev. Noble came to then Masulipatnam (now Machilipatnam also known as Bandar) as a Christian Missionary in 1841 and stayed until his death. He and his friend late Mr. Sharkey opened a native English school on 21 November 1843 as Noble High School. That school became Noble College later on. This school was termed by the head of the Madras Government "The Cambridge of South India." It is one of the first four educational institutions opened in India by the British Government.

The founder of Noble College, late Rev.Robert Turlington Noble was sent by the Church Missionary Society in England to serve in the areas of both Education and Evangelism in South India.

In the year 1864 Noble High School attained the College status, affiliated to Madras University. It flourished as the Leading College in South India until 1938. In the year 1938, the Lindsay Commission suggested that Noble College, Machilipatnam and Andhra Christian College, Guntur should be merged and a new college to be started at Vijayawada. Accordingly, Noble College was closed in 1938, however the proposed new college was permanently shelved.

During the first phase of 74 years of existence of Noble College, the following great personalities had their college education at Noble College: late Dr. B. Pattabhi Sitaramaiah (President of Indian National Congress, Governor of Madhya Pradesh and Founder of Andhra Bank), late Sri.Mutnuri Krishna Rao (Freedom fighter and Editor of “Krishna Pathrica”), late Sri. Kasu Brahmananda Reddy (former Honorable Chief Minister of Andhra Pradesh, Union Home Minister, Governor of Maharashtra), late Sri. Koka Subba Rao, (former Chief Justice of Supreme Court), late Smt. Manchala Krishnamma, (first woman graduate from Madras University) and late Sri.Viswanadha Satyanarayana (veteran poet and Gnanapeet Awardee).

Because of the relentless great efforts of late Rt. Rev. Dr. N.D. Anandarao Samuel, the then bishop in Krishna-Godavari Diocese of Church of South India (CSI), Noble College was revived in June 1966 after getting the approval the Government of Andhra Pradesh. Bishop Anandarao Samuel was in need of financial resources to kick start the revival of Noble College, and in order to achieve this monumental task he used his personal relationship with late Mr. Dukkipati Madhusudana Rao, the then famous Telugu movie producer (Annapurna Pictures Pvt. Ltd), who in turn had roped in his partner in the movie business, the legendary Telugu Movie Actor late Sri. Dr. Akkineni Nageswara Rao (ANR) to raise funds by performing stage programs. ANR and his team of Telugu movie actors acted in the charitable benefit show stage programs that were organised in the town of Machilipatnam and the much needed funds for the revival of Noble College were raised through these stage shows.

The college started functioning in July 1966 with late Sri.A.F. Thyagaraju, M.A. (London) as its first principal. The college was formally inaugurated on 27 August 1966 by late Sri. Kasu Brahmananda Reddy, the then Honorable Chief Minister of Andhra Pradesh and a former student of Noble College. Late Sri.B.V.Subba Reddy the then speaker of the Legislative Assembly of Andhra Pradesh and also a former student presided over the function. Late Professor K.R.Srinivasa Iyengar, the then vice-chancellor of Andhra University delivered the inaugural address.

The revived Noble College was formerly affiliated to Andhra University, Waltair till 1985. Then, in the year 1985 the affiliation was shifted to Acharya Nagarjuna University, Guntur and presently it is affiliated to Krishna University, Machilipatnam since 2010. The college attained Autonomous Status in the year 2007-08.

Since then Noble College has been a leading educational institution serving all sections of community in and around Machilipatnam.

It is now administered by the Krishna Godavari Diocese of the Church of South India.

Noble College is having partnership with the Laubach-Kollege of the Protestant Church in Hesse and Nassau (Germany).

Principals
 Late Rev. Robert Turlington Noble - B.A., (Cantab) 1843–1865
 Late Rev. J. Sharp - M.A., (Oxon) 1865–1878
 Late Rev. E. N. Hodges - M.A., (Oxon) 1878-1887
 Late Rev. C.W.A. Clarke - M.A., (Cantab) 1887 - 1906
 Late Rev. W. C. Penn - M.A., (Oxon) 1906–1922
 Late Rev. J. Roy Strock - M.A., D.D., 1922–1926
 Late Rev. A. B. John Stone - M.A., (Cantab) 1926–1934
 Late Rev. W. Shuttle Worth - M.A., (Oxon) 1934–1938
 Late A. F. Thyagaraju - M.A., (Penna) 1966–1973
 Late Dr. Thomas - M.A., Ph.D., (Penna) 1973–1975
 Late A David - M.A., 1975–1979
 Late G.A.F Jaya Paul - M.A., B.Ed., 1979–1980
 Late G.E.T Azariah - M.Sc., 1980–1994, died on 02.03.2016
 Late T. V. Prafulla Kumar - M.Sc., 1994–2001, died on 25.11.2015
 Late B. Prabhu Das - M.A., 2001–2003, died on August 13, 2016
 Dr. K. Samuel - M.A., Ph.D., 2003–2006
 Dr. D. Nalini - M.Sc., M.Phil., Ph.D., 2006–2012
 Dr. P. V. Anila - M.A., M.Phil., Ph.D., 2012-2022
 Dr. S. John Ernest - M.A., Ph.D., 2022-Present

Academics

Courses
 Intermediate (equivalent to Plus 1 and Plus 2) with subjects like MPC, BiPC, CEC, MEC, HEC etc, in Telugu and English medium
 Bachelor degrees in Mathematics, Physics, Chemistry, Electronics, Computer Science, Statistics, Botany, Zoology, Commerce, Economics, History etc., in Telugu and English medium
 A few post graduation courses

Notable alumni
 Bhogaraju Pattabhi Sitaramayya, president of the Indian National Congress
 Mutnuri Krishna Rao, founder A.J. Kalasala, Machilipatnam
 Viswanatha Satyanarayana, poet, winner of Jnanpith Award
 Banda Kanaka Lingeswara Rao, dramatist
 Kasu Brahmananda Reddy, former chief minister of Andhra Pradesh
 Kala Venkata Rao, former vice-president and general secretary of Andhra Pradesh Congress Committee
 Lanka Sundaram, member of parliament and expert in International Law
 Most. Rev. Dr. Govada Dyvasirvadam, bishop in Krishna-Godavari Diocese and moderator in the Church of South India 
 Kamalakara Kameshwara Rao, Indian film director popularly known as Pouraanika Chitra Brahma
 B. V. Subba Reddy, speaker of Andhra Pradesh Legislative Assembly
 Dukkipati Madhusudhana Rao, Telugu cinema
 K. Jeeva Sagar, Indian ambassador to Kuwait

Notes

Colleges in Andhra Pradesh
Universities and colleges in Krishna district
Educational institutions established in 1843
1843 establishments in British India
Machilipatnam